Željka is a feminine given name, the feminine form of Željko. Notable people with the name include:

Željka Antunović (born 1955), Croatian centre-left politician
Željka Čižmešija, Croatian retired figure skater
Željka Krizmanić (born 1987), Croatian figure skater
Željka Nikolić (born 1991), Serbian handballer
Željka Radanović (born 1989), Montenegrin footballer

Croatian feminine given names
Serbian feminine given names